is a 1956 Japanese film directed by Torajiro Saito.

Cast
 Ichikawa Raizō VIII

References

External links
 http://www.raizofan.net/link4/movie2/yajikita.htm

1956 films
Daiei Film films
1950s Japanese films